The Navy–Notre Dame football rivalry is an American college football rivalry between the Navy Midshipmen football team of the United States Naval Academy and Notre Dame Fighting Irish football team of the University of Notre Dame. It was played annually from 1927 to 2019, which made it the longest uninterrupted intersectional rivalry in college football,  the third-longest uninterrupted college football rivalry overall, as well as the second-longest never-interrupted rivalry in Division I college football (FBS). Due to the COVID-19 pandemic, the 2020 game was canceled, ending these lengthy streaks, even though both schools still played a fall season schedule in 2020.

Notre Dame leads the series 79–13–1. Before Navy won a 46–44 triple-overtime contest in 2007, Notre Dame had a 43-game winning streak that was the longest series win streak between two annual opponents in the history of Division I FBS football. Navy's previous win came in 1963, 35–14 with future Heisman Trophy winner and NFL quarterback Roger Staubach at the helm. Navy had come close to winning on numerous occasions before 2007. The Midshipmen subsequently won again in 2009, 2010 and 2016.

Host sites
Though the game is often played at Notre Dame Stadium in South Bend whenever Notre Dame is the home team, it has never been played at Navy–Marine Corps Memorial Stadium in Annapolis due to its relatively small size. Instead, Navy usually hosts the game at larger facilities such as Baltimore's old Memorial Stadium or current M&T Bank Stadium, FedExField in Landover, Maryland, or at Giants Stadium or MetLife Stadium in East Rutherford, New Jersey. From 1960 to 1970, the Midshipmen hosted the game at John F. Kennedy Stadium in Philadelphia, and they hosted the 1972, 1974 and 1993 games at Philadelphia's Veterans Stadium.

On occasion, the rivalry took place in other stadiums away from the East Coast, particularly in cities with large populations of United States Navy personnel. Cleveland Stadium hosted games between 1932 and 1978 as Cleveland, Ohio, had a considerable swath of naval officers, while the 2016 game was held at EverBank Field in Jacksonville, Florida, where Naval Air Station Jacksonville is located. Navy's 2018 home game was played at SDCCU Stadium in San Diego, California, which has multiple military installations and the largest naval fleet in the world, in the rivalry's first meeting west of the Mississippi River.

The game has been played twice in Dublin, Ireland—in 1996 at Croke Park and 2012 at Aviva Stadium. A return to Aviva in 2020 was called off due to the COVID-19 pandemic, with the game first being moved to Annapolis before finally being canceled altogether; this would have been the first time the game was played at Navy's home stadium. A new date at Aviva was set in 2023.

History
Despite the one-sided result the last few decades, most Notre Dame and Navy fans consider the series a sacred tradition for historical reasons. Both schools have strong football traditions going back to the beginnings of the sport. Notre Dame, like many colleges, faced severe financial difficulties during World War II, which were exacerbated by the fact that it was then still an all-male institution. The US Navy made Notre Dame a training center for V-12 candidates and paid enough for usage of the facilities to keep the University afloat. Notre Dame has since extended an open invitation for Navy to play the Fighting Irish in football and considers the game annual repayment on a debt of honor.

The series is marked by mutual respect, as evidenced by each team standing at attention during the playing of the other's alma mater after the game, a tradition that started in 2005. Navy's athletic director Chet Gladchuk Jr., on renewing the series through 2016, remarked "...it is of great interest to our collective national audience of Fighting Irish fans, Naval Academy alumni, and the Navy family at large." The series is scheduled to continue indefinitely; renewals are a mere formality. On August 6, 2020, Navy and Notre Dame signed an agreement continuing their rivalry series for the next 12 seasons, from 2021 through 2032.

The 2020 game was canceled due to the COVID-19 pandemic and the resulting disruption to college football schedules. Notre Dame opted to play an Atlantic Coast Conference schedule for that one season only. The ACC allowed each team to play one non-conference game, which had to be in the school's home state. Western Michigan originally agreed to make the short trip from Kalamazoo to South Bend on September 19, but the Broncos subsequently canceled their entire fall season. Notre Dame subsequently scheduled a home game on that date against South Florida of the American Athletic Conference instead. Notre Dame won that game 52–0. Meanwhile, The Midshipmen opted to play independent BYU instead of Notre Dame, in Annapolis; BYU routed Navy 55–3 behind closed doors.

The Streak
Notre Dame's NCAA-record 43-game win streak against Navy began in 1964:
 1964 – Notre Dame 40, Navy 0: Notre Dame came in at 5–0 under first year coach Ara Parseghian and  shut out the Midshipmen in a game that pitted 1963 Heisman Trophy winner Roger Staubach against 1964 winner John Huarte.
 1969 – Notre Dame 47, Navy 0: The Irish set a still-standing, single-game school record of 720 total offensive yards.
 1974 – Notre Dame 14, Navy 6: For three quarters, Navy kept the Fighting Irish offense in check with its punting game and led 6–0 going into the fourth quarter. Notre Dame quarterback Tom Clements threw a touchdown pass to Pete Demmerle to put the Fighting Irish in front, then Randy Harrison added an insurance touchdown with an interception return.  Unbeknownst to anyone at the time, Irish coach Ara Parseghian privately decided to resign at the end of the season after this game.
 1976 – Notre Dame 27, Navy 21: Irish defensive back Dave Waymer tipped away a fourth down pass in the end zone late in the game to preserve the win for Notre Dame.
 1984 – Notre Dame 18, Navy 17: John Carney's field goal with 14 seconds left erased a 17–7 deficit.  
 1991 – Notre Dame 38, Navy 0:  Notre Dame's 700th victory.
 1997 – Notre Dame 21, Navy 17: Allen Rossum saved the day for the Fighting Irish, knocking Navy receiver Pat McGrew out of bounds at the 1-yard line on a 69-yard pass as time ran out.
 1999 – Notre Dame 28, Navy 24: Notre Dame needed a 1st down on 4th and 9 with 1:37 left. They failed to convert but an errant spot allowed the Irish to keep possession and eventually score to escape with a 28–24 win.
 2002 – Notre Dame 30, Navy 23: Notre Dame, coming off a 14–7 upset loss to Boston College, scored 15 unanswered points late in the fourth quarter to win under first-year head coach Tyrone Willingham.
 2003 – Notre Dame 27, Navy 24: D. J. Fitzpatrick's 40-yard field goal as time expired lifted the Fighting Irish over Navy.
 2007 – Navy 46, Notre Dame 44 (3OT) – After 43 years, Navy beat Notre Dame in triple overtime.

Game results

Television
In years when Navy hosts (even-numbered), ESPN holds rights to the game as part of an expanded deal with the American Athletic Conference, which Navy participates in for football. Prior to this, these rights belonged to CBS.

In years when Notre Dame hosts (odd-numbered), it is carried on NBC as per the university’s contract with the network.

See also

 List of NCAA college football rivalry games

Notes

References

College football rivalries in the United States
Navy Midshipmen football
Notre Dame Fighting Irish football